John William Springthorpe (1855–1933) was an Australian physician. He was the first Australian graduate to become a member of the Royal College of Physicians of London.

The Springthorpe Memorial at Boroondara General Cemetery was constructed in memory of his wife Annie, who died during childbirth in 1897.

See also

References

1855 births
1933 deaths
Australian medical doctors